Liao I-chiu (b. Nov. 4, 1936) is a Taiwanese academic who specializes in commercial aquatic animal breeding and aquaculture. He is known as the "Father of Shrimp Farming".

Early life and education 
Liao was born in Tokyo to Taiwanese parents on 4 November 1936, and moved to Taiwan at the age of four. He grew up in Fengyuan, Taichung. In 1962 he went back to Japan to study at the University of Tokyo. He returned to Taiwan in 1968 after earning his Ph.D. in agriculture.

Career 
In the late 1960s Liao played an important role in developing methods to farm tiger shrimp. In 1968 he was named a fellow of the Rockefeller Foundation.

Liao is a fellow at Academia Sinica and The World Academy of Sciences and a distinguished professor at National Taiwan Ocean University.

Awards and recognitions 
In 2012 he was given a Lifetime Achievement Award by the Global Aquaculture Alliance.

In 2014 Liao was awarded the Order of the Rising Sun, Gold Rays with Rosette by the Japanese Government.

In 2019 he was awarded the Nikkei Asia Prize in Science and Technology for his work on shrimp breeding.

See also
 Maritime industries of Taiwan

References 

Taiwanese agriculturalists
Living people
Members of Academia Sinica
TWAS fellows
University of Tokyo alumni
Aquaculture
People from Tokyo
1936 births
Recipients of the Order of the Rising Sun
Winners of the Nikkei Asia Prize